Pieter Adriaensz. Verbeek (1575–1637), was a Dutch Golden Age mayor of Haarlem.

He was the son of Adriaen Verbeek, a Haarlem toll collector, and Hendrikje van Teylingen. He married Anna van Duuren in 1599 and became a judge, magistrate, tax receiver and mayor of Haarlem. He became a member of the St. James guild (St. Jacobsgilde) and lieutenant of the St. George militia in Haarlem from 1612-1615, captain from 1618-1621, and provoost from 1621-1637. He was portrayed by Frans Hals in The Banquet of the Officers of the St George Militia Company in 1616.

He died in Haarlem.

References

Pieter Adriaensz. Verbeek in De Haarlemse Schuttersstukken, by Jhr. Mr. C.C. van Valkenburg, pp. 67, Haerlem : jaarboek 1958, ISSN 0927-0728, on the website of the North Holland Archives

1575 births
1637 deaths
Frans Hals
People from Haarlem
Mayors of Haarlem